Brownleea is a genus of flowering plants from the orchid family, Orchidaceae native to Africa and Madagascar. Eight species are known.

Brownleea coerulea Harv. ex Lindl.
Brownleea galpinii Bolus
Brownleea graminicola McMurtry
Brownleea macroceras Sond.
Brownleea maculata P.J.Cribb
Brownleea mulanjiensis H.P.Linder
Brownleea parviflora Harv. ex Lindl.
Brownleea recurvata Sond.

In a classification of orchids that was published in 2015, the genera Brownleea and Disperis constituted the subtribe Brownleeinae of the tribe Orchideae. A sister relationship between Brownleea and Disperis received only weak statistical support in a 2009 study. In Genera Orchidacearum, the subtribe Brownleeinae was placed in the tribe Diseae, but this tribe is no longer recognized because it has been shown to be paraphyletic over the tribe Orchideae.

See also 
 List of Orchidaceae genera

References

Further reading 
 Berg Pana, H. 2005. Handbuch der Orchideen-Namen. Dictionary of Orchid Names. Dizionario dei nomi delle orchidee. Ulmer, Stuttgart

Orchids of Madagascar
Orchids of Africa
Orchideae
Orchideae genera